Dominique Benichetti (May 16, 1943-July 29, 2011) was a French film director and producer known for documentaries, pioneering work on 3D film, animation, and special projects.

Early life 
Dominique was born in Paris in 1943. He studied at the National School for Applied Arts, the National Superior School of Fine Arts, and the Institute for Advanced Cinematographic Studies (IDHEC) in Animation.

Career 
Over the course of his professional life, Benichetti directed and produced more than 30 films. He worked on documentaries, educational, scientific, institutional, and corporate films.  He was active in animation, and was a creative and technical consultant on many 3D and large format (70mm) film projects. He advised on 3D technology for The Futuroscope Park in Poitiers, France.

Benichetti was also active in the United States, teaching documentary filmmaking at Harvard University, as well as working at the Jefferson Laboratories of Experimental Physics, and the Harvard Smithsonian Center for Astrophysics. In Hollywood, he worked at Gower Studios as a consultant stereographer.

Cousin Jules 
Benichetti's documentary "Le Cousin Jules" was produced over the course of 5 years (from April 1968 to March 1973). The film shows the everyday life of Benichetti's cousin Jules Guiteaux and his wife Félicie as they work on their farm in the French countryside. The film (unseen for several decades) was considered a masterpiece when released, showing at a number of festivals and winning awards. It was noted for the Cinemascope work of cinematographer Pierre-William Glen and its stereophonic sound. This long métrage obtained the Jury Prize at the Locarno Festival in 1973.

As of 2012, "Le Cousin Jules" has been restored and is once again being shown in film festivals.

Successful films 
L’Odyssée magique / The Magical Odyssey : the much acclaimed 70 mm/ 8 film completed in March 2009 for Giscard d'Estaing's Vulcania Edutainement Park in Auvergne, Benichetti was chosen over stiff competition - including such high level contenders as Earth photographer Yan-Arthus Bertrand  - to realize this fanciful fairy tale documentary of a hymn to Nature which was filmed in 70mm/8perfs in Iceland, Colorado,  French Guiana,  Grand Canyon, California Viet Nam and France. In this production, he directed as well the part of Titania, a charming cartoon fairy character, made with computer graphics animation, and blended in the live action of the movie.
 

La Revole : a delightful 20 minute 3-D musical comedy,  is the high point of the Beaujolais Wine Museum, applauded by approximately 150,000 visitors a year.  He wrote the screenplay and the lyrics, drew the storyboard, and directed the movie while keeping both eyes on the stereography.

Le Prix de la Liberté / The Price of Freedom : a 20 mn film in 35 mm and 360 degrees, created for the Museum in Arromanches to celebrate the 50th anniversary of the Normandy Landings in 1944. He wrote and directed the film, blending in a circular continuum the shots filmed by war correspondents with staged sequences of contemporary Normandy. It has been viewed by over 2 million spectators, and is still running in the circular theater specially built for the film, overlooking the bay of Arromanches.

Family name 
Since 2005, Benicheti is also written Benichetti with "tt".

See also 
 63rd Berlin International Film Festival
 Vulcania

References

External links 
 Listing for Dominique Benicheti on IMDB
 Website for restored 2013 release of Cousin Jules
 Listing for the 50th NY Film Festival Screening of Cousin Jules
 Trailer for the restored re-release of Cousin Jules
 Fiche du film Le Cousin jules sur AlloCiné

1943 births
2011 deaths
French screenwriters
French animators
French film producers
French animated film directors
French animated film producers
Film directors from Paris